The National Counter-Terrorism Action Group (NACTAG) was formed on November 27, 2007, with its existence announced to the public on November 29, 2007. It is a counter-terrorism body under the Anti-Terrorism Council. NACTAG is under the direct command of the National Security Advisor.

History
After its formation on November 27, 2007, and the announcement of its establishment on November 29, 2007, the Group was trained by the RP-UK Crisis Management Assistance Program, in cooperation with the British Embassy. The training programme was revealed to the public in January 2008. Former Philippine National Police chief, Arturo Lomibao, was appointed as the group's first chief officer.

The NACTAG held its first anti-terrorist exercises at the Light Railway Transit-2 station in Cubao and at the Metro Rail Transit North Avenue Station to prepare authorities for future terrorist attacks after a bombing was reported at Iligan City.

Lomibao kept his position in 2009 when a cabinet shuffle took place. There was an accusation that Lomibao's appointment is a sign of cronyism from ex-President Gloria Macapagal Arroyo.

NACTAG was later renamed as National Counter Terrorism Unit (NCTU) under the leadership of former army general Fernando Mesa. Its role was expanded to cover coordination, intelligence and operational control of strategic counterterrorism operations. Apart from specially-trained civilian operatives and operations support staff, the Unit retained operationally controlled units from special operations units of the Armed Forces of the Philippines, Philippine National Police, Bureau of Fire Protection and Philippine Coast Guard. The Unit is known to have utilized TAVOR CTAR Carbines and Jericho pistols.

NCTU also collaborates with Department of Transportation and Communications' Office for Transportation Security, the Anti-Money Laundering Council and the National Intelligence Coordinating Agency. The NCTU also spearheaded Chemical Biological Radiological Nuclear and Explosives (CBRNE) initiatives, most notable of which is the National CBRNE Protocol Manual, in collaboration with the Office of Civil Defense and the Department of Health's Health Emergency Management Staff.

Mandate
The mandate of the NACTAG is to be "involved in the actual investigation, in case of a terrorist attack, and in providing prosecutors with “enough evidence and witnesses so that the cases will stand in court in accordance with Republic Act (RA) 9372" or the Human Security Act."

Lineage of Chiefs
PDG Arturo Lomibao, PNP
MGEN Fernando Mesa, AFP

References

Philippine intelligence agencies
Law enforcement in the Philippines